Eliezer Gomes (1920–1979) was a Brazilian actor. Born in Santo Antônio de Pádua or Conceição de Macabu, he debuted on Roberto Farias' 1962 film O Assalto ao Trem Pagador. In 1975, he won the Gramado Film Festival Best Actor Award for his performance on Walter Hugo Khouri's O Anjo da Noite.

Selected filmography
 O Assalto ao Trem Pagador (1962)
 Choque de Sentimentos (1965)
 Faustão (1971)
 O Anjo da Noite (1974)
 Joanna Francesa (1975)

References

External links

1920 births
1979 deaths
Brazilian male film actors
People from Rio de Janeiro (state)
20th-century Brazilian male actors